During the 2005–06 season, the Guildford Flames played their inaugural season in the EPIHL. It was the 14th year of Ice Hockey played by the Guildford Flames.

The Flames had a 20-game winning streak to start of the season. The club did not suffer their first league loss until 19 November 2005, when the Swindon Wildcats beat the Flames 7–4.

The Flames would end up finishing the regular league season with 39 wins, 6 losses and 3 ties to claim the EPL league title.

Player statistics

Netminders

Results

Regular season

Play-offs

External links 
 Official Guildford Flames website

References 

Guildford Flames seasons
Gui